Kürd Eldarbəyli (also, Kurd Eldarbeyli) is a village and municipality in the Ismailli District of Azerbaijan.  It has a population of 762. The municipality consists of the villages of Kurd Eldarbeyli and Güdəyli.

References 

Populated places in Ismayilli District